Phajeer  is a village in the southern state of Karnataka, India. It is located in the Bantwal taluk of Dakshina Kannada district in Karnataka, at a distance of 23 km from Mangalore city.

Demographics
As of 2001 India census, Phajeer had a population of 5885 with 2964 males and 2921 females.

See also
 Dakshina Kannada
 Districts of Karnataka

References

External links
 http://dk.nic.in/

Villages in Dakshina Kannada district